"Love Rain (Koi no Ame)" is a song recorded by Japanese R&B singer Toshinobu Kubota for his compilation album, Love & Rain: Love Songs (2010). The song was released on June 6, 2010, as the lead single from the album.

Background
"Love Rain (Koi no Ame)" was written and produced by Kubota, and arranged by Yoichiro Kakizaki. It served as the theme song for the Japanese TV drama Tsuki no Koibito ~Moon Lovers~. It is noted that the English version of the song appears on the album Gold Skool. The song also appears on Kubota's compilation album The Baddest: Hit Parade. On July 19, 2010, Kubota performed the song alongside the Bank Band at the AP Bank Fes' 2010. The performance was featured the Bank Band's concert DVD "Live & Documentary DVD: Ap Bank Fes '10".

The B-side, "Timeless Affection", is the full version of the interlude songs featured on Kubota's fifteenth album Timeless Fly.

Music video

Kubota also shot a music video for "Love Rain (Koi no Ame)". The music video began with Kubota singing in an empty room on a pedestal on stage, while video recording his performance. He is later seen video recording himself before a huge open comic book sketch. Kubota is also seen in a forest during night time. Other scene during the music video include the usage of video shots of many comic book sketches shown throughout the music video.

Chart performance
The song charted at number 3 on the Oricon Daily Singles and number 3 on the Oricon Weekly Singles chart, selling 22,000 copies in the first week of its release. "Love Rain (Koi no Ame)" also chart at number 5 on Billboard Japan Hot 100 chart. During the week of June 16 to June 22, 2010, the song also peaked at number 1 on the RIAJ Digital Tracks chart.

Track listing
CD Single
Love Rain (Koi no Ame)
Timeless Affection (Full version)
Love Rain (Koi no Ame) (Instrumental)

Charts and certifications

References

2010 singles
Japanese television drama theme songs
RIAJ Digital Track Chart number-one singles
Toshinobu Kubota songs
2010 songs
Songs written by Toshinobu Kubota
SME Records singles